Asharh ( āshāḍh,  āsāḍha) is the third month of the Bengali and Odia calendars and the Nepali system of the Hindu calendar. It is the first of the two months that comprise the wet season, locally known as "Barsha" ( Bôrsha,  Barsha,  Barsā), when the monsoon winds blow. It is one of the first five months of the year that have 31 days, according to the Bangladeshi version of the Bengali Calendar. In the Indian version of the Bengali Calendar, the month can have up to 32 days.

Etymology 
It is named for the constellation Uttarashadha ( Uttôrashaŗha), identified with Sagittarius.

Culture

Bengali culture 
The month and the monsoon are welcome with songs, dance, and celebration in Bangladesh. A popular poem "Abar Eshechhey Asharh" আবার এসেছে আষাঢ় by Rabindranath Tagore, that is about this season.

Odia culture 
There are occurrences of an extra Asadha which is referred as  maḷa māsa (meaning unclean) in Odia whereas the non-extra Asadha is referred to as  suddha.

See also
 Equivalent month in Hindu calendar, Aashaadha

References

Months of the Bengali calendar